San Sisto is a Romanesque-style Roman Catholic church in the town of Viterbo in the Region of Lazio. The church was once known as San Sisto fuori la Porta Romana.

Description 
The church was erected in the 11th-century, likely on the site of a prior chapel or aedicule. It once had an adjacent palace and monastery, and served as a hostel for pilgrims en route to Rome. The church has undergone a number of reconstructions along the centuries, most notably after much damage from bombing during World War II.

A 19th-century description of the church bemoaned the state of the church: Later transformations embellished even more brutally, the primitive style of this temple. The vaults were designed to conceal the old skeletal roofs of the aisles: many altars ripped through the majestic nakedness of the walls and insolent masons covered them with mortar giving in to those who can care not a whit how many paintings, inscriptions and other precious memories existed in that place.

The simple facade was reconstructed after the war. The lower of two belltowers dates to the 13th century. The taller belltower, with 19th-century clock, was originally a defensive tower in the city walls. The latest reconstruction removed much of the post-Romanesque additions, including an adjacent nave. The basilica layout has a series of rounded arches, perched on medieval Corinthian columns, flanking the linear central nave, that leads to a series of staircases rising to the altar and apse. The apse once abutted the medieval walls of Viterbo.

The interior contains both a font and an altar derived from Roman spolia. The sole internal altarpiece is a Madonna, Child, and Saints (1457) by Neri di Bicci.

Notes

External links 
 

Sisto
Romanesque architecture in Lazio
12th-century Roman Catholic church buildings in Italy